The Pâscov is a left tributary of the river Ialomița in Romania. It discharges into Ialomița in Gheboaia.

References

Rivers of Romania
Rivers of Dâmbovița County